Glen Donegal (born 20 June 1969 in Northampton, England) is a former professional footballer who played in The Football League for Maidstone United and Northampton Town.

References

English footballers
Northampton Town F.C. players
English Football League players
1969 births
Living people
Aylesbury United F.C. players
Maidstone United F.C. (1897) players
Rushden & Diamonds F.C. players
Association football forwards